The Gibraltar variant British passport is a British passport issued to British Citizens and British Overseas Territory Citizens who work or live in Gibraltar. Having Gibraltarian status alone, and not being resident in Gibraltar, is insufficient criteria to obtain a Gibraltar Passport. Gibraltar passports are issued by the Passport Office of the Gibraltar Civil Status and Registration Office. Since 2005, passports issued in Gibraltar have been biometric.

As a result of the British Nationality Act 1981, Gibraltarians were made British Overseas Territories citizens by default, but could apply for registration as a British citizen ("an entitlement that cannot be refused") under section 5 of the Act before 2002. Despite not being British citizens prior to 2002 and hence having no automatic right of abode in the United Kingdom, all BOTCs connected to Gibraltar have enjoyed the right to live and work in the EEA countries (including the United Kingdom itself) since 1973 through the territory’s accession to the European Community along with the United Kingdom, and their Gibraltar passports have borne observations to demonstrate such treaty rights.

Under the British Overseas Territories Act 2002, all British Overseas Territories citizens have become British citizens on 21 May 2002. Therefore, a Gibraltarian may apply for either a passport describing them as a British citizen or a passport describing them as a BOTC. However, unlike other BOTCs, Gibraltarians cannot hold both passports simultaneously, and a BOTC passport would be cancelled if its holder decides to apply for a British citizen passport at any time. Holders of BOTC passports also face different visa requirements than holders of British citizen passports.

Until 31 January 2020, Gibraltarians who opted for the BOTC passport were considered "UK nationals for EU purposes", making them full citizens of the European Union with all consequential rights and entitlements. Following the UK's withdrawal from the EU, Gibraltar is no longer part of the EU and Gibraltarian BOTCs ceased to be EU citizens, although they continued to enjoy the same rights in the EU during the transition period until 31 December 2020. On 31 December 2020, the governments of Spain and the UK announced that Gibraltar will become a part of the Schengen area.

Similar to those of the UK, new Gibraltarian passports will be blue. However, the timescale for their introduction has not been confirmed.

Gibraltarians travelling within the European Union, EEA and Switzerland are entitled to use a Gibraltar identity card instead of a Gibraltar passport as a travel document.

Differences
British passports issued in Gibraltar differ from UK issued ones only in some of the wording but otherwise have the same status. The word "Gibraltar" is added beneath "United Kingdom of Great Britain and Northern Ireland" and on the information page. The only other difference is that Gibraltar-issued passports replace the mention of Her Britannic Majesty's Secretary of State with The Governor of Gibraltar:

Changes to the passport's wording, replacing "Her Majesty" with "His Majesty," will be undertaken following the death of Queen Elizabeth II.

Historical Passports

See also
History of nationality in Gibraltar
Gibraltarian status

References

External links
HM Government of Gibraltar: Passports and Nationality

Gibraltar
Passport
British passports issued to British Overseas Territories Citizens
Gibraltar and the European Union